Murder by Proxy is a 1954 British film noir crime drama film directed by Terence Fisher and starring Dane Clark, Belinda Lee and Betty Ann Davies. The screenplay concerns a man who is offered money to marry a woman. It was produced by Hammer Films and shot at the company's Bray Studios in Berkshire with sets designed by the art director J. Elder Wills. It released in the United States by Lippert Pictures as Blackout.

Plot summary
Drunk and down-and-out Casey Morrow (Clark) in London is approached by a young and beautiful heiress, Phyllis Brunner (Lee), offering him much money if he will marry her. He accepts, but then wakes up the next morning in some other woman's apartment with blood on his coat from the murder of Brunner's father. Now he must unravel the mystery to clear his name, which leads him into a twisted labyrinth of encounters with various suspicious characters who seem to make his situation worse the more he learns.

Cast
 Dane Clark as Casey Morrow
 Belinda Lee as Phyllis Brunner
 Betty Ann Davies as Mrs. Alicia Brunner
 Eleanor Summerfield as Maggie Doone
 Andrew Osborn as Lance Gordon
 Harold Lang as Travis / Victor Vanno
 Jill Melford as Miss Nardis
 Alvys Maben as Lita Huntley 
 Michael Golden as Inspector Johnson
 Nora Gordon as Casey's mother
 Alfie Bass as Ernie
 Delphi Lawrence as Linda
 Arnold Diamond as Mrs. Brunner's Butler
 Cleo Laine as 	Singer 
 Olive Sloane as 	Landlady

Production
The film was based on a novel Murder by Proxy which was published in 1952. It was the first movie in an eight picture contact between Hammer Films and Lippert Pictures.

Dane Clark's casting was announced in September 1953. He stayed on in England to make Five Days.

Script supervisor Renee Glynne later recalled that Belinda Lee "was still very inexperienced at that time and I had to watch her quite carefully. She'd cross her legs the wrong way or turn her head at the wrong moment or come out with the wrong line, so I'd have to correct her and try to help her out. Dane obviously fancied her and got very cross with my professional interference'. He got quite nasty and was actually pushing me away from her." Glynne says she had to take medication "in order to survive the rest of the film. After that I had to give all my instructions to him through the director, Terry Fisher...after some shots he'd have to put his head under cold water because he was so enraged that I was even there. Eventually he realised how silly it all was and went down on his knees, tears streaming down his face, begging me to forgive him, But I still asked Tony Hinds to take me off the next film he was in."

Reception
The Monthly Film Bulletinsaid "the treatment is sufficiently persuasive to bring a fair amount of excitement to the well tried material."

Variety called it "a gabby, overlong, import from England that has Dane Clark heading the cast as the only name known in the domestic market. Condition of the supporting feature market is such currently that the film will have no trouble getting bookings, even though it offers scant measure of entertainment.... There’s nothing the players can do with the plot as presented under the production helming of Michael Carreras, and Terence Fisher's direction is deliberate to the extreme, even for a British offering."

Filmink called it "an entirely decent, unpretentious film noir; the age gap between the leads is annoying, but Lee is an ideal femme-fatale-or-isn’t-she?"

References

External links
 
 
Murder by Proxy at Letterbox DVD
Review of movie at Variety

1954 films
1950s crime drama films
British crime drama films
Films directed by Terence Fisher
British black-and-white films
Film noir
Films based on American novels
Hammer Film Productions films
Lippert Pictures films
Films shot at Bray Studios
Films set in London
1954 drama films
1955 drama films
1955 films
1950s English-language films
1950s British films